Raúl Ernesto Coloma Rivas (9 July 1928 – 12 October 2021) was a Chilean footballer who played as a goalkeeper.

Club career
In his early years, Coloma was with Unión Española, but he made his professional debut playing for Ferrobádminton, staying at it until 1964. After playing for Municipal Santiago, he played at amateur level from 1968 to 1970 and then joined Ferroviaros in the Segunda División until 1975. In the Chilean football, he holds the record of having played to the professional football to the highest age: 47 years old.

As a curiosity, he stated that the former Chilean goalkeeper Sergio Livingstone was his idol, replacing him in his farewell match against Argentina on 1959.

International career
Coloma played in 13 matches for the Chile national team in 1959 and 1960. He was also part of Chile's squad for the 1959 South American Championship that took place in Argentina.

Personal life
Both his brother, Julio, and his son, Luis, were professional footballers. When he played for Ferroviarios, he ran into Julio who was a goalkeeper too and  faced Luis.

References

External links
 

1928 births
2021 deaths
Chilean footballers
Chile international footballers
Association football goalkeepers
Badminton F.C. footballers
Ferroviarios footballers
Chilean Primera División players
Primera B de Chile players
Footballers from Santiago